Martin Hoel Andersen (born 4 December 1995) is a Norwegian professional footballer who plays as a forward for Sarpsborg.

Club career
He played youth and senior football Tistedalen TIF before joining Sarpsborg 08 FF's junior setup. He also made his senior debut in May 2013 against  	
Haugesund. After this one game he was sent on loan to Kvik Halden FK in the entire 2015 season, permanently in 2016. Scoring double digits in the 2016 2. divisjon, he went up one tier when signing for FK Jerv.

References

External links

1995 births
Living people
People from Halden
Norwegian footballers
Sarpsborg 08 FF players
Kvik Halden FK players
FK Jerv players
Øygarden FK players
Kongsvinger IL Toppfotball players
Eliteserien players
Norwegian First Division players
Association football midfielders
Sportspeople from Viken (county)